William Hale (August 6, 1765 – November 8, 1848) was an American merchant, shipowner and politician. He served as a U.S. representative from New Hampshire during the early 1800s.

Early life and career
Hale was born in Portsmouth in the Province of New Hampshire, the son of Samuel Hale and Mary Wright Hale. He attended the public schools. He moved to Dover, New Hampshire around 1765 to work with his older brother Samuel as a merchant, shipowner and shipbuilder.

He served in the New Hampshire Senate from 1796-1800, and as member of the Governor's Council from 1803–1805. Hale was elected as a Federalist to the Eleventh Congress serving from March 4, 1809 – March 3, 1811. He was reelected to serve in the Thirteenth Congress and Fourteenth Congress, and served from March 4, 1813 – March 3, 1817.

Hale died in Dover on November 8, 1848, and is interred in Pine Hill Cemetery.

Personal life
Hale married Lydia Rollins on April 30, 1794. Their children included: Thomas Wright (1795-1855); John (1796-1798); Mary Ann (1798-1882); Elizabeth (1800-1882); Lydia Rollins (1803-1877); William (1804-1893); Andrew Rollins (1806-1876); Samuel (1808-1810); Charles (1810-1819); and Richard Rollins (1812-1815).  Elizabeth Hale was the second wife of Jeremiah Smith.

William Hale House
In December 1980, Hale's home in Dover was added to the National Register of Historic Places. The house was built in 1806 and built in the Federalist style. Hale hosted both President James Monroe and General Lafayette in his home.

References

External links

 William Hale House
 Samuel Hale and Ichabod Rollins Papers

	

1765 births
1848 deaths
New Hampshire state senators
Members of the Executive Council of New Hampshire
Politicians from Portsmouth, New Hampshire
Federalist Party members of the United States House of Representatives from New Hampshire